Hammonton is a town in Atlantic County, in the U.S. state of New Jersey, that has been referred to as the "Blueberry Capital of the World". As of the 2020 United States census, the town's population was 14,711, a decrease of 80 (−0.5%) from the 2010 census count of 14,791, which in turn reflected an increase of 2,187 (+17.4%) from the 12,604 counted in the 2000 census.

Hammonton was settled in 1812 and was named for John Hammond Coffin, a son of one of the community's earliest settlers, William Coffin, with the "d" in what was originally Hammondton disappearing over time. It was incorporated as a town by an act of the New Jersey Legislature on March 5, 1866, from portions of Hamilton Township and Mullica Township. 

The town is located directly between Philadelphia and the resort town of Atlantic City, along a former route of the Pennsylvania Railroad with Hammonton station directly in the downtown area. The route is now used by NJ Transit's Atlantic City Line.

History
Little is known of the area of Hammonton before European contact. Stone tools have been found in digs in the area probably dating from the Woodland period, so there was some population, but further details have not been ascertained.  At the time of European contact, the general area was inhabited by the Unalachtigo Lenape.  As European settlement continued, the Lenape in the area declined from disease, loss of land to Europeans, and emigration elsewhere.  The West Jersey Society was granted rights over a large tract of land in the English Province of New Jersey to parcel out in 1748, including the territory of future Hammonton.  The Society sold a parcel of what would become future Hammonton in 1805, with the territory passing through several hands.  William Coffin and his family came to the land in 1812 to build a home and operate a sawmill for John R. Coates; Coffin purchased the land and mill outright in 1814. The mill was not in the exact location of the modern downtown, but rather by the shore of Hammonton Lake and stretching to the north and east of the current town.  The town was initially called "Hammondton" after Coffin's son John Hammond Coffin; later town governments would drop the "d", leading to the modern name of Hammonton.  In 1817, Coffin opened a glass factory in the area, as the glass industry was a major South Jersey industry at the time due to the availability of cheap timber and bog iron; the Mullica River was used to transport the finished products in an era before railroads.  Trading stores and homes for workers were built as well.

The early Old Hammonton settlement was still quite tiny, and the glass industry began to fade in importance.  It was replaced by farming, especially of strawberries and blueberries.  The Camden and Atlantic Railroad began service in 1854, running to the west of Old Hammonton.  Developer Charles K. Landis and Philadelphia banker Richard Byrnes formed a partnership in 1856, Landis & Byrnes, which purchased large tracts of land near the recently built railroad; they then advertised the town of Hammonton and began to sell off small parcels for development.  This had the result of moving the settlement to the modern location of Hammonton, away from the river, the old method of bulk transportation; it was now closer to the railroad, with the Hammonton Railroad Station was established in 1858.  In 1861, Landis and Byrnes had a falling-out; Byrnes remained in Hammonton while Landis left to found the cities of Vineland and Sea Isle City.  In 1866, Hammonton's leaders petitioned the legislature to separate Hammonton from Mullica Township and Hamilton Township which it was then part of.  Hammonton was directly incorporated by act of the New Jersey Legislature on March 5, 1866 as a "Town", an unusual form of government of which Hammonton is the only example in Atlantic County.  A census taken at time of incorporation counted 1422 inhabitants of the town.

A major factor in the history of Hammonton after incorporation was a wave of Italian immigration to the town.  Salvador Calabrasce, an Italian immigrant who served in the Union Navy in the Civil War, married a New Jerseyan and moved to Hammonton.  He sent letters back to his friends in Gesso on Sicily which attracted immigrants to come to Hammonton.  The efforts of Calabrasce and others saw a growing population of Italian-Americans in the town who would go on to make up a substantial portion of the town's overall population.

Hammonton was briefly host to a major racing track, the Atlantic City Speedway.  Races were held from 1926–1928 on the wooden track built, complete with a direct rail connection.  The owners had hoped to compete with the major racetracks of the era, but were unable to continue.  The track served as a test track for Studebaker from 1928 to 1933 before it was demolished and the timber used to build it repurposed for other buildings.

The first Hammonton Blueberry Festival was held in 1953, embracing the area's identity as a grower of blueberries.

Geography
According to the U.S. Census Bureau, Hammonton had a total area of 41.32 square miles (107.01 km2), including 40.75 square miles (105.54 km2) of land and 0.57 square miles (1.46 km2) of water (1.37%).

The town borders Folsom borough, to the southwest, and both Hamilton and Mullica townships to the southeast in Atlantic County; Shamong Township and Washington Township in Burlington County to the northeast; and Waterford Township and Winslow Township in Camden County to the northwest. It is located in the Atlantic Coastal Plain, so is largely flat, though the highest point in Atlantic County is located along the Pennsylvania Railroad within the borders of Hammonton. The town is located almost exactly halfway between Philadelphia and Atlantic City.

Unincorporated communities, localities and place names located completely or partially within the town include Barnard, Bellhurst, Caldwell Crossing, Dacosta, Dutchtown, Great Swamp, Murphy, Rockford, Rockwood, Rosedale and West Mills.

Pine Barrens
The town is one of 56 South Jersey municipalities that are included within the New Jersey Pinelands National Reserve, a protected natural area of unique ecology covering , that has been classified as a United States Biosphere Reserve and established by Congress in 1978 as the nation's first National Reserve. All of the town is included in the state-designated Pinelands Area, which includes portions of Atlantic County, along with areas in Burlington, Camden, Cape May, Cumberland, Gloucester and Ocean counties.

Due to its location in the Pine Barrens, the soil is largely sandy, making it ideal for growing blueberries. Low, marshy areas, often within the Pine Barrens are also used for cranberry cultivation.

On June 19, 2022 a fire broke out in the Wharton State Forest in a remote area in the northern part of Hammonton. The Mullica River Fire consumed more than 15,000 acres of protected land and became the largest wildfire in the state in 15 years. The cause of the fire is believed to be caused by an illegal campfire.

Climate
Hammonton lies in the northern reaches of the humid subtropical climate zone, and, similar to inland southern New Jersey, is characterized by brisk winters, hot summers, and plentiful precipitation spread evenly throughout the year.  According to the Köppen Climate Classification system, Hammonton's climate is abbreviated "Cfa" on climate maps.

Demographics

2010 census

The Census Bureau's 2006–2010 American Community Survey showed that (in 2010 inflation-adjusted dollars) median household income was $59,085 (with a margin of error of +/− $3,242) and the median family income was $62,354 (+/− $3,893). Males had a median income of $47,110 (+/− $4,411) versus $36,615 (+/− $3,549) for females. The per capita income for the borough was $25,292 (+/− $1,528). About 8.4% of families and 10.2% of the population were below the poverty line, including 13.1% of those under age 18 and 9.2% of those age 65 or over.

2000 census
As of the 2000 United States census there were 12,604 people, 4,619 households, and 3,270 families residing in the town. The racial makeup of the town was 87.85% White, 1.74% African American, 0.14% Native American, 1.14% Asian, 0.02% Pacific Islander, 7.83% from other races, and 1.27% from two or more races. Hispanic or Latino of any race were 14.88% of the population.

As of the 2000 Census, 45.9% of town residents were of Italian ancestry, the second-highest percentage of any municipality in the United States (behind Johnston, Rhode Island, at 46.7%), and highest in New Jersey, among all places with more than 1,000 residents identifying their ancestry. News reports have said Hammonton leads the nation in Italian-Americans per capita.

There were 4,619 households, out of which 30.2% had children under the age of 18 living with them, 54.6% were married couples living together, 11.2% had a female householder with no husband present, and 29.2% were non-families. 23.9% of all households were made up of individuals, and 12.5% had someone living alone who was 65 years of age or older. The average household size was 2.65 and the average family size was 3.14.

In the town, the population was spread out, with 22.8% under the age of 18, 7.9% from 18 to 24, 29.2% from 25 to 44, 22.1% from 45 to 64, and 18.0% who were 65 years of age or older. The median age was 39 years. For every 100 females, there were 93.9 males. For every 100 females age 18 and over, there were 92.7 males.

The median income for a household in the town was $43,137, and the median income for a family was $52,205. Males had a median income of $36,219 versus $27,900 for females. The per capita income for the town was $19,889. About 5.7% of families and 9.1% of the population were below the poverty line, including 9.0% of those under age 18 and 10.8% of those age 65 or over.

Arts and culture
Musical groups from the town include the rock band The Early November.

Sports
In 1997, Gabriel Donio (founder and publisher of The Hammonton Gazette) proposed a minor-league baseball team called the Hammonton Blueberries, going so far as to create a team logo and a prototype uniform, as well as purchasing a 20-acre tract of land for $200,000. Donio planned to build on the site a 3,500-seat, six-million-dollar ballpark, which he described as "a rough miniature of the Brooklyn Dodgers' Ebbets Field". In 1999, the Northern League announced that they would form a six-team developmental circuit and include Hammonton as one of the clubs; however, this did not happen, and the proposed ballpark was not built, putting an end to the Blueberries. (Since Hammonton is less than 75 miles from Philadelphia, any pro baseball team there would either need permission from the Phillies or play in an independent league, outside of MLB's jurisdiction.)

Government

Local government
Hammonton is governed under the Town form of New Jersey municipal government. The town is one of nine municipalities (of the 564) statewide that use this traditional form of government. The governing body is comprised of the Mayor and the Town Council, with all positions elected at-large on a partisan basis as part of the November general election. The Mayor is elected to a four-year term. The Town Council is comprised of six members elected to serve two-year terms on a staggered basis, with three seats coming up for election each year.

, the Mayor of Hammonton is Independent Steve DiDonato, whose term of office ends December 31, 2025. Members of the Hammonton Town Council are Deputy Mayor Tom Gribbin (I, 2024), Steve Furgione (I, 2023), Bill Olivo (I, 2023), Jonathan Oliva (I, 2024), Sam Rodio (I, 2023) and Ed Wuillermin (I, 2024).

The mayor and council members are affiliated with Hammonton First, an independent political organization that was established in 2005 and swept that November's elections, winning the mayoral seat and all three council seats.

Federal, state and county representation
Hammonton is located in the 2nd Congressional District and is part of New Jersey's 8th state legislative district. Prior to the 2011 reapportionment following the 2010 Census, Hammonton had been in the 9th state legislative district.

 

Atlantic County is governed by a directly elected county executive and a nine-member Board of County Commissioners, responsible for legislation. The executive serves a four-year term and the commissioners are elected to staggered three-year terms, of which four are elected from the county on an at-large basis and five of the commissioners represent equally populated districts. , Atlantic County's Executive is Republican Dennis Levinson, whose term of office ends December 31, 2023. Members of the Board of County Commissioners are:

Ernest D. Coursey, District 1, including Atlantic City (part), Egg Harbor Township (part), and Pleasantville (D, 2022, Atlantic City), Chair Maureen Kern, District 2, including Atlantic City (part), Egg Harbor Township (part), Linwood, Longport, Margate City, Northfield, Somers Point and Ventnor City (R, 2024, Somers Point), Andrew Parker III, District 3, including Egg Harbor Township (part) and Hamilton Township (part) (R, Egg Harbor Township, 2023), Richard R. Dase, District 4, including Absecon, Brigantine, Galloway Township and Port Republic (R, 2022, Galloway Township), James A. Bertino, District 5, including Buena, Buena Vista Township, Corbin City, Egg Harbor City, Estell Manor, Folsom, Hamilton Township (part), Hammonton, Mullica Township and Weymouth Township (R, 2018, Hammonton), Caren L. Fitzpatrick, At-Large (D, 2023, Linwood), Frank X. Balles, At-Large (R, Pleasantville, 2024) Amy L. Gatto, Freeholder (R, 2022, Hamilton Township) and Vice Chair John W. Risley, At-Large (R, 2023, Egg Harbor Township) 

Atlantic County's constitutional officers are: 
County Clerk Joesph J. Giralo (R, 2026, Hammonton),  
Sheriff Eric Scheffler (D, 2024, Northfield) and 
Surrogate James Curcio (R, 2025, Hammonton).

Politics
As of March 2011, there were a total of 8,556 registered voters in Hammonton, of which 1,851 (21.6% vs. 30.5% countywide) were registered as Democrats, 2,627 (30.7% vs. 25.2%) were registered as Republicans and 4,076 (47.6% vs. 44.3%) were registered as unaffiliated. There were 2 voters registered as Libertarians or Greens. Among the town's 2010 Census population, 57.8% (vs. 58.8% in Atlantic County) were registered to vote, including 75.5% of those ages 18 and over (vs. 76.6% countywide).

In the 2016 presidential election, Republican Donald Trump received 3,859 votes (60.08% vs 44.64% countywide), ahead of Democrat Hillary Clinton with 2,366 votes (36.84% vs 51.61%) and other candidates with 198 votes (3.08% vs 3.76%). A total of 6,423 ballots were cast. In the 2012 presidential election, Republican Mitt Romney received 3,420 votes here (54.4% vs. 41.1% countywide), ahead of Democrat Barack Obama with 2,777 votes (44.1% vs. 57.9%) and other candidates with 57 votes (0.9% vs. 0.9%), among the 6,290 ballots cast by the town's 8,951 registered voters, for a turnout of 70.3% (vs. 65.8% in Atlantic County). In the 2008 presidential election, Republican John McCain received 3,509 votes here (54.0% vs. 41.6% countywide), ahead of Democrat Barack Obama with 2,894 votes (44.5% vs. 56.5%) and other candidates with 89 votes (1.4% vs. 1.1%), among the 6,502 ballots cast by the town's 9,090 registered voters, for a turnout of 71.5% (vs. 68.1% in Atlantic County). In the 2004 presidential election, Republican George W. Bush received 3,218 votes here (54.1% vs. 46.2% countywide), ahead of Democrat John Kerry with 2,600 votes (43.7% vs. 52.0%) and other candidates with 47 votes (0.8% vs. 0.8%), among the 5,947 ballots cast by the town's 7,913 registered voters, for a turnout of 75.2% (vs. 69.8% in the whole county).

In the 2017 gubernatorial election, Republican Kim Guadagno received 2,425 votes (56.38% vs 42.46% countywide) ahead of Democrat Phillip Murphy with 1,726 votes (40.13% vs 55.14%), and other candidates with 150 votes (3.49% vs 2.41%). There were a total of 4,301 votes cast.  In the 2013 gubernatorial election, Republican Chris Christie received 3,234 votes here (68.7% vs. 60.0% countywide), ahead of Democrat Barbara Buono with 1,229 votes (26.1% vs. 34.9%) and other candidates with 60 votes (1.3% vs. 1.3%), among the 4,709 ballots cast by the town's 9,033 registered voters, yielding a 52.1% turnout (vs. 41.5% in the county). In the 2009 gubernatorial election, Republican Chris Christie received 2,588 votes here (53.7% vs. 47.7% countywide), ahead of Democrat Jon Corzine with 1,773 votes (36.8% vs. 44.5%), Independent Chris Daggett with 204 votes (4.2% vs. 4.8%) and other candidates with 93 votes (1.9% vs. 1.2%), among the 4,822 ballots cast by the town's 8,724 registered voters, yielding a 55.3% turnout (vs. 44.9% in the county).

Education
Students in kindergarten through twelfth grade attend the Hammonton Public Schools. As of the 2018–19 school year, the district, comprised of four schools, had an enrollment of 3,566 students and 249.7 classroom teachers (on an FTE basis), for a student–teacher ratio of 14.3:1. Schools in the district (with 2018–19 enrollment data from the National Center for Education Statistics) are 
Early Childhood Education Center with 355 students in grades K–1, 
Warren E. Sooy Elementary School with 873 students in grades 2–5, 
Hammonton Middle School with 879 students in grades 6–8 and 
Hammonton High School with 1,393 students in grades 9–12.

Students from Folsom Borough (grades 9–12) and Waterford Township in Camden County (7–12) attend the Hammonton schools as part of sending/receiving relationships with the Folsom Borough School District and the Waterford Township School District.

In the wake of the dissolution of the Lower Camden County Regional School District, the Hammonton board of education voted in 1999 to begin accepting an estimated 800 students from Waterford Township for grades 7–12 starting as of 2002, with the tuition paid by students from Waterford helping to lower overall costs to Hammonton taxpayers.

Borough public school students are also eligible to attend the Atlantic County Institute of Technology in the Mays Landing section of Hamilton Township or the Charter-Tech High School for the Performing Arts, located in Somers Point.

Hammonton was home of the Catholic schools St. Joseph Regional Elementary School (for Pre-K–8) and St. Joseph High School (for grades 9–12) which operated under the jurisdiction of the Diocese of Camden. In April 2020, the Diocese of Camden announced that despite its status as a football powerhouse, St. Joseph was one of five Catholic schools in New Jersey which would close permanently at the end of the school year on June 30, 2020. St. Joseph Regional Elementary was to permanently close at the end of the school year as well. St. Joseph High School reopened in September 2020 as the independent St. Joseph Academy, which operates separately from the Camden Diocese and leases the building from the Hammonton Public Schools, which had acquired the building.

Media

Television stations

WPSJ-CD Channel 8 Hammonton (Independent)

Newspapers
Hammonton Gazette
Hammonton News

Hammonton is served by other newspapers:
The Press of Atlantic City a major daily newspaper in South New Jersey.
Philadelphia Daily News a major daily newspaper based in Philadelphia.
The Philadelphia Inquirer a major daily newspaper based in Philadelphia.

Transportation

Roads and highways

The Atlantic City Expressway, U.S. Route 30, U.S. Route 206 and Route 54 all pass through Hammonton, as do County Route 536, County Route 542, County Route 559 and County Route 561.

Public transportation

The Hammonton station of NJ Transit provides passenger rail service between the Atlantic City Rail Terminal in Atlantic City and 30th Street Station in Philadelphia and intermediate points on the Atlantic City Line.

NJ Transit provides bus service in Hammonton on the 554 route between Lindenwold station and Atlantic City.

Airport

Community

Blueberry capital
Hammonton is known as the "Blueberry Capital of the World".

Since the 1980s, the Red, White and Blueberry Festival has celebrated Hammonton's status as the nation's blueberry capital. A  farm in the town is Northeast's largest blueberry grower.

Presidential visits
Ronald Reagan visited Hammonton during his 1984 re-election campaign. Reagan's speech highlighted Hammonton's status as "Blueberry Capital of the World" and then extolled the virtues of New Jersey native Bruce Springsteen.

Bruce soon disassociated himself from the politics and the use of his song "Born in The U.S.A."

Hammonton has also been visited by Ulysses S. Grant and Theodore Roosevelt, who made whistle stops in the town.

Festivals
Every year Hammonton hosts the Red, White and Blueberry festival, Our Lady of Mount Carmel festival and the Hammonton wine festival. Mount Carmel's Italian Festival dates back to 1875 and is considered the oldest such continuously run festival in the United States. Other festivals include; Hammonton Fall Beer Festival, Teen Arts Festival, Hammonton Food Truck Festival, Hammonton Green Day Festival, and Crusin Main Street.

Downtown

Hammonton's downtown district has been growing for the past 20 years. The downtown area includes Bellevue Avenue, Central Avenue, Vine street, Second Street, Third Street, Twelfth Street, Egg Harbor Road, Front Street, West End Avenue, Railroad Avenue and Washington Street. The downtown includes art galleries, restaurants, wine and sports bars, banks, clothing stores, offices, a theatre, a park, and a college satellite campus, attracting shoppers from South Jersey.

Every year the downtown has three parades. The Halloween and Christmas parades are the two major parades that happen in downtown. In May, there is a smaller Memorial Day parade. The Downtown also hosts the annual Christmas Tree Lighting, which is a large celebration that includes the lighting of a large tree on the corner of Bellevue and Central Avenue, Christmas carolers, a music show, carriage rides, a live nativity and the arrival of Santa. During these events the downtown stores are open late.

On the third Thursday of every month, the downtown host the "Third Thursday Events", with a different theme each month. Stores offer discounts, and people perform on the street.

The downtown was one of the finalist for the Great American Main Street Award in 2013. The award recognizes three communities each year for their successful revitalization efforts, based on documented economic impact, small-business development, historic preservation, volunteer involvement, public/private cooperation and success over time.

Events
In 1949, Hammonton was the winner of the Little League World Series, after finishing third in the tournament in both 1947 and 1948. The Hammonton team was the first official team located outside of Pennsylvania.

On July 24, 2011, Ricca's Italian Bakery set a Guinness World Record for the Longest Line of Cakes topped with fresh blueberries donated by local farmers. This received recognition from the Mayor Steve DiDonato and all members of the Hammonton Town Council. The Hammonton Town Council Deputy Mayor Tom Gribbin announced the recognition during a town council meeting on local TV in 2011 August.

In November 2014, in a study conducted by CreditDonkey.com, Hammonton was ranked second-happiest city in New Jersey. The ranking was based on restaurants, crime rate, commute, departure time, income, divorce rate, and housing.

Wineries and alcohol consumption
Hammonton has three active wineries – DiMatteo Vineyards, Plagido's Winery, and Tomasello Winery.

On June 7, 2013, the Eagle Theatre in Hammonton became the first theater in New Jersey to sell alcoholic beverages and allow spectators to drink wine during the show. Under an arrangement reached under the authority of the New Jersey Division of Alcoholic Beverage Control, Sharrott Winery will be able to sell patrons bottles of wine that can be consumed during shows at the theater.

Hammonton has also seen a growth in the craft beer industry. Since 2015, three breweries have opened in town, Tomfoolery Brewing Company, Three 3's Brewing Company, and Vinyl Brewing.

Popular culture
The 2002 direct-to-video horror film 13th Child, about the hunt for the Jersey Devil, was filmed in Hammonton.

A 2011 episode of Supernatural, "How to Win Friends and Influence Monsters" about the Jersey Devil, is set in Hammonton, though it wasn't filmed there.

Hammonton made a cameo appearance in the first two episodes of the HBO series Boardwalk Empire, with a scene towards the end of both episodes showing the town sign "Welcome to Hammonton, The Blueberry Capital of the World".

The Fox TV show American Idol aired its first episode of its 12th season in January 2013 with a performance by Sarah Restuccio, a seventeen-year-old girl from Hammonton. The judges enjoyed her rendition of "Mama's Song" by Carrie Underwood, but she impressed them when they asked her to sing something else and she rapped "Super Bass" by Nicki Minaj. The show featured a short clip about Sarah's life, which included showing her everyday life in Hammonton.

In October 2013 the MTV reality show True Life, featured the episode "True Life Presents: My Dad Is A Bro" about a girl in her twenties and her father in his fifties, who both party. The episode takes place throughout Hammonton.

In the summer of 2013, scenes from the independent film The Honour were filmed in Hammonton.

In May 2015, a commercial for the male clothing brand, Chubbies Shorts, was filmed on South Second Street in Hammonton.

Notable people

People who were born in, residents of, or otherwise closely associated with Hammonton include:

 Tyler Bellamy (born 1988), soccer player
 Jill Biden (born 1951), educator and First Lady of the United States
 Ray Blanchard (born 1945), sexologist
 Reverend Gary Davis (1896–1972), blues and gospel singer who was also proficient on the banjo, guitar and harmonica
 Anthony Durante (1967–2003), professional wrestler
 Ace Enders (born 1982), musician
 Marie Howland (1836–1921), feminist writer
 Johnnie O. Jackson (born 1971), professional bodybuilder and powerlifter
 Nelson Johnson (born 1948), former Atlantic County Superior Court Judge and author of Boardwalk Empire: The Birth, High Times, and Corruption of Atlantic City, a chapter of which about Enoch L. "Nucky" Johnson—"Atlantic City's Godfather"—became the basis for the series Boardwalk Empire
 Margaret Mead (1901–1978), cultural anthropologist who did some of her first research in Hammonton
 Victor Moore (1876–1962), actor
 Rita Myers (born 1947), video installation artist.
 George Washington Nicholson (1832–1912), landscape painter who retired to Hammonton around 1902 and lived there until his death in 1912
 Ron Previte (born 1943), former member of the Philadelphia crime family
 Andrew Rider (1866–1898), founder of Rider University, who lived and was buried in Hammonton
 Nicodemo Scarfo (born 1929), member of the American Mafia who was Boss of the Philadelphia crime family, who spent summers working in Hammonton as blueberry picker
 Tony Siscone (born 1949), professional race car driver
 Alma Joslyn Whiffen-Barksdale (1916–1981), mycologist who discovered cycloheximide
 Gary Wolfe (born 1967), professional wrestler
 Thomas Ricca (Tom Ricca, born 1968) former professional WWE wrestler

Sister city
San Gregorio da Sassola, Province of Rome,

References

External links

 Hammonton Town website
 Hammonton Public Schools
 
 Data for the Hammonton Public Schools, National Center for Education Statistics
 Hammonton Lions Club
 Hammonton United Services Association
 Hammonton Area Ministerium
 MainStreet Hammonton
 St. Joseph Regional High School
 Hammonton First
 Hammonton Republican Club
 Hammonton Democratic Club
 The Hammonton Gazette – Hammonton's local newspaper. The print edition is published on Wednesdays. Website updated weekly with selected content from print edition.
 The Hammonton News – The print edition is published on Wednesdays. Website updated Wednesday mornings, with full stories from paper edition.

 
1866 establishments in New Jersey
Italian-American culture in New Jersey
Populated places in the Pine Barrens (New Jersey)
Populated places established in 1866
Town form of New Jersey government
Towns in Atlantic County, New Jersey